Lepidoptera is the fourth major studio release by Fursaxa.

Track listing
"Freedom" – 6:09
"Purple Fantasy" – 3:05
"Velada" – 5:42
"Moonlight sonata" – 4:31
"Neon Lights" – 2:54
"Karma" – 3:59
"Poppy Opera" – 7:28
"Russian Snow Queen" – 3:50
"Pyracantha" – 5:28
"Tyranny" – 7:27
"Una De Gato" – 7:52

External links
Pitchfork
Popmatters
Foxy Digitalis
Baltimore City Paper

2005 albums
Fursaxa albums